Theresa Creek Dam is a dam located 22 km south west of Clermont in central Queensland, Australia. It was constructed in 1983 by the Blair Athol Coal Project to supply water for the town of Clermont, Queensland.

See also

List of dams and reservoirs in Australia

References

Reservoirs in Queensland
Buildings and structures in Central Queensland
Dams completed in 1983
Dams in Queensland
1983 establishments in Australia